Democratic Centre (identified electorally as Democratic Centre – Strong Hand, Big Heart) is a conservative political party in Colombia founded in 2013 by Álvaro Uribe, former President of Colombia, former Vice President Francisco Santos Calderón and former Minister of Finance and Public Credit Óscar Iván Zuluaga. It is a self-described party of the centre, although in opinion groups it is often considered centre-right to right-wing. The party won the 2018 presidential elections.

History 
The party was founded in 2014.  A key factor in this were the Government negotiations with FARC, the Popular sovereignty force in the Colombian armed conflict against policies of Political economy.

Although created as a decidedly right-wing party, its members now come from a wide range of political backgrounds, including former politicians of the right-wing Conservative Party, the center-right Social Party of National Unity, and from the left-wing Alternative Democratic Pole, such as Senator Everth Bustamante.

During the 2020 United States elections, Democratic Centre promoted Republican Party candidates in the United States, especially in Florida, sharing their support for President of the United States Donald Trump. The party's involvement with promoting political candidates in a foreign election drew controversy among some observers.

The party was considered a regional partner of European Conservatives and Reformists Party until 2022.

Electoral history
In the 2014 congressional elections, the Democratic Centre won 20 seats in the Senate and 19 seats in the Chamber of Representatives.

In the 2014 presidential election, the Democratic Centre chose Óscar Iván Zuluaga, the Senator and Finance Minister during the Uribe Administration, as its presidential nominee. Zuluaga won the first round, but subsequently lost the second round to incumbent President Santos.

Despite the second round loss, the electoral performance in both congressional and presidential elections provided the Democratic Centre with a platform to establish itself as the major opposition party in Colombia. The party has since taken steps to improve its political infrastructure given that it lagged in funding and party organisation compared to more traditional political parties.

Presidential elections

Legislative elections

References

2013 establishments in Colombia
Anti-communism in Colombia
Christian democratic parties in Colombia
Conservative parties in Colombia
Political parties established in 2013
Right-wing populist parties
Right-wing populism in South America
Right-wing parties in South America
Social conservative parties